The Spirit of the Ghetto: Studies of the Jewish Quarter in New York is a 1902 book by Hutchins Hapgood about the lives of Jews in New York City. Originally published by Funk & Wagnalls and illustrated by Jacob Epstein, Harvard's Belknap Press reissued the book in 1967.

Bibliography

External links 

 
 

1902 non-fiction books
English-language books
Books about Jews and Judaism
Jews and Judaism in New York City
History of New York City
Funk & Wagnalls books
Belknap Press books